Spaggiari is an Italian surname.

Notable people with this surname include:
 Albert Spaggiari (1932–1989), French criminal
 Antonella Spaggiari (born 1957), Italian politician
 Bruno Spaggiari (born 1933), Italian motorcycle racer

Italian-language surnames